

Result of municipal elections
Results of the 1945 municipal elections.

References

Local elections in Norway
1940s elections in Norway
Norway
Local